Muromachi (室町) is a Japanese name derived from a path called  of the ancient capital of Heian-kyō, present-day Kyoto. 

It may also refer to:
  in Kyoto, Japan, which was originally Muromachi kōji
 , the palace of the Ashikaga clan, more often called  with the main gate facing Muromachi Street
 Muromachi shogunate, a shogunate (military government) headquartered in the palace  
 Muromachi period, a division of Japanese history, named after the shogunate
 Muromachi, Tokyo, a district of Tokyo, which is named after Muromachi in Kyoto and is home to the Mitsui Group companies, such as Mitsukoshi department store chain
 a Japanese family name: e.g.  and